Mariana Henriques (born 27 July 1994) is an Angolan swimmer. She competed at the 2012 Summer Olympics in the 50 m freestyle, but failed to reach the final.

Career
Born in Luanda, Henriques represented Angola at the 2010 Summer Youth Olympics, in 50 metre breaststroke and 100 metre breaststroke. She competed at the 2011 World Aquatics Championships, the only woman qualified from Angola.

She placed 61st in women's 50 metre freestyle at the 2012 Summer Olympics in London.

References

External links

1994 births
Living people
Sportspeople from Luanda
Angolan female swimmers
Olympic swimmers of Angola
Swimmers at the 2012 Summer Olympics
Swimmers at the 2010 Summer Youth Olympics